Jack Nolan is the name of:

Jack Nolan (actor), Irish actor
Jack Nolan (Australian footballer) (1902–1971), Australian rules footballer
Jack Nolan (English footballer) (born 2001), English footballer